Provincial road N763 (N763) is a road connecting N308 near Wezep with the Europa-Allee in Kampen.

Route description
It passes under Rijksweg 50 (N50) and N764 without exits to them.

References

External links

763
763
763
Kampen, Overijssel
Oldebroek